The index of physics articles is split into multiple pages due to its size.

To navigate by individual letter use the table of contents below.

F

F(R) gravity
F-number
F-term
F-theory
F. David Peat
F. Dow Smith
F. J. Duarte
F. Richard Stephenson
FBI mnemonics
FBTR
FDTD model
FDTD modeling
FDTD models
FFAG accelerator
FLASH
FLEX (satellite)
FLUKA
FOMP
FP420 experiment
FRS Fragment Separator
FTCS scheme
FUTBOLIN
FU Orionis star
Fabiola Gianotti
Fabrication and testing of optical components
Fabry–Pérot interferometer
Face centred cubic metal
Facility for Antiproton and Ion Research
Facility for Rare Isotope Beams
Factors of polymer weathering
Faddeev equations
Faddeev–Popov ghost
Fahrenheit hydrometer
Fall cone test
Falling cat problem
False sunrise
False vacuum
Family (particle physics)
FanWing
Fang Lizhi
Fanning friction factor
Fanno flow
Fano noise
Fano resonance
Fano resonances
Far-infrared laser
Far point
Farad
Faraday's law of induction
Faraday Medal and Prize
Faraday Society
Faraday Wheel
Faraday cage
Faraday constant
Faraday cup
Faraday cup electrometer
Faraday effect
Faraday paradox
Faraday wave
Farhad Ardalan
Farrington Daniels
Fast and Realistic OpenGL Displayer
Fast atom bombardment
Fast fission
Fast ion conductor
Fast multipole method
Faster-than-light
Faster-than-light neutrino anomaly
Fault current limiter
Faxén's law
Fay Ajzenberg-Selove
Fay Dowker
Fayet–Iliopoulos D-term
Fazle Hussain
Featherstone's algorithm
Federico Capasso
Feedback linearization
Feedback topology
Feigenbaum constants
Feigenbaum function
Feinberg reinterpretation principle
Felice Fontana
Felici's law
Felix Andries Vening Meinesz
Felix Berezin
Felix Bloch
Felix Ehrenhaft
Felix Maria von Exner-Ewarten
Felix Villars
Felix Weinberg
Feng Duan
Feodosy Krasovsky
Ferdinand Brickwedde
Ferdinand Kurlbaum
Ferdynand Antoni Ossendowski
Ferenc Krausz
Fereydoon Family
Fermat's principle
Fermi's golden rule
Fermi's interaction
Fermi acceleration
Fermi contact interaction
Fermi coupling constant
Fermi energy
Fermi gas
Fermi level
Fermi liquid theory
Fermi point
Fermi problem
Fermi resonance
Fermi surface
Fermi surface of superconducting cuprates
Fermilab
Fermilab E-906/SeaQuest
Fermion
Fermion doubling
Fermionic condensate
Fermionic field
Fermi–Dirac statistics
Fermi–Pasta–Ulam–Tsingou problem
Fermi–Walker differentiation
Fermi–Walker transport
Fernand Holweck
Fernando Quevedo
Fernando Sanford
Ferrimagnetism
Ferrite (magnet)
Ferroelectret
Ferroelectricity
Ferrofluid
Ferroics
Ferromagnetic interaction
Ferromagnetic material properties
Ferromagnetic resonance
Ferromagnetism
Fertile material
Feryal Özel
Feshbach–Fano partitioning
Fessenden oscillator
Few-body systems
Feynman's Lost Lecture: The Motion of Planets Around the Sun
Feynman checkerboard
Feynman diagram
Feynman graph
Feynman parametrization
Feynman slash notation
Feynman sprinkler
Feza Gürsey
Fiber Bragg grating
Fiber laser
Fibre optic gyroscope
Fick's laws of diffusion
Fictitious force
Field-emission electric propulsion
Field-reversed configuration
Field-theoretic simulation
Field (physics)
Field aligned irregularities
Field electron emission
Field emission microscopy
Field emission probes
Field equation
Field of Streams
Field rate
Field strength
Fierz identity
Fifth force
Figure-8 laser
Figure of the Earth
Figuring
Filament propagation
Film-forming agent
Film temperature
Filter (large eddy simulation)
Filter (signal processing)
Fin (extended surface)
Fine-structure constant
Fine-tuned universe
Fine-tuning
Fine structure
Fineness ratio
Finite-difference frequency-domain method
Finite-difference time-domain method
Finite-volume method
Finite potential well
Finite strain theory
Fiodar Fiodaraŭ
Fiorella Terenzi
Fire
Fire point
Fire whirl
Firmin Abauzit
First-order fluid
First-order transition
First Step to Nobel Prize in Physics
First class constraint
First law of thermodynamics
First quantization
First superstring revolution
Fischler–Susskind mechanism
Fissile
Fission Product Pilot Plant
Fission products (by element)
FitzHugh–Nagumo model
Fixed-focus lens
Fixed-pattern noise
Fixture unit
Fizeau experiment
Fizeau's measurement of the speed of light in air
Fizz keeper
Flack parameter
Flame
Flame detector
Flammability
Flammability limit
Flap (aircraft)
Flap back
Flare spray
Flash evaporation
Flash freezing
Flash point
Flat-field correction
Flat lens
Flat weighting
Flatness (cosmology)
Flatness (liquids)
Flatness problem
Flattening
Flavor-changing neutral current
Flavour (particle physics)
Flavour quantum number
Flavour quantum numbers
Fleming's left-hand rule for motors
Fleming's right hand rule
Flerovium
Fletcher–Munson curves
Flexible SPC water model
Flexiverse
Flexural rigidity
Flexural strength
Flicker noise
Flight
Flight dynamics (fixed wing aircraft)
Flipped SO(10)
Flipped SU(5)
Float-zone silicon
Floating water bridge
Flocculation
Floer homology
Flood
Florentina Mosora
Floris Nollet
Flory–Huggins solution theory
Flory–Rehner equation
Flow, Turbulence and Combustion
Flow coefficient
Flow conditions
Flow limiter
Flow measurement
Flow sensor
Flow separation
Flow through nozzles
Flow tracer
Flow velocity
Flow visualization
Flowing-afterglow mass spectrometry
Floyd K. Richtmyer
Floyd Richtmyer
Fluctuation-dissipation theorem
Fluctuation theorem
Fluence
Fluid
Fluid Dynamics Prize (APS)
Fluid dynamic gauge
Fluid dynamics
Fluid mechanics
Fluid meter
Fluid parcel
Fluid pipe
Fluid pressure
Fluid solution
Fluid statics
Fluid theory of electricity
Fluidics
Fluidyne engine
Fluid–structure interaction
Fluorescence
Fluorescence spectroscopy
Fluoride volatility
Fluoroposs
Flux
Flux-Corrected Transport
Flux limiter
Flux linkage
Flux method
Flux pinning
Flux quantization
Flux tube
Fluxoid
Fluxon
Flyby anomaly
Flying-spot scanner
Flying wing
Focal length
Fock matrix
Fock space
Fock state
Fock–Lorentz symmetry
Focus (optics)
Foe (unit)
Fog bow
Folded optics
Foldy–Wouthuysen transformation
Foot-lambert
Foot per second
For All Practical Purposes
Forbidden mechanism
Forbush decrease
Force
Force-free magnetic field
Force between magnets
Force carrier
Force density
Force field (chemistry)
Force field (physics)
Ford viscosity cup
Forecasting complexity
Form factor (quantum field theory)
Form factor (electronics)
Form factor (radiative transfer)
Forschungsreaktor 2 (FR2)
Forschungszentrum Jülich
Forward-swept wing
Forward scatter
Forward scattering alignment
Fossil stellar magnetic field
Foster's reactance theorem
Fotini Markopoulou-Kalamara
Foucault pendulum
Foucault's measurements of the speed of light
Fouling
Foundational Questions Institute
Foundations of Physics
Four-acceleration
Four-bar linkage
Four-current
Four-dimensional space
Four-fermion interactions
Four-force
Four-frequency
Four-gradient
Four-momentum
Four-tensor
Four-vector
Four-velocity
Fourier optics
Fourier pair
Fourier transform infrared spectroscopy
Fourier transform ion cyclotron resonance
Fractal cosmology
Fractal derivative
Fractal dimension
Fractional Schrödinger equation
Fractional anisotropy
Fractional quantum Hall effect
Fractional supersymmetry
Fractoluminescence
Fracton
Fracture mechanics
Fracture toughening mechanisms
Fragment separator
Frame-dragging
Frame fields in general relativity
Frame of reference
Fran Bošnjaković
Frances Hellman
Francesco Calogero
Francesco Carlini
Francesco Maria Grimaldi
Francesco Rossetti
Francesco Sannino
Francesco Zantedeschi
Francis Allotey
Francis Birch (geophysicist)
Francis Bitter
Francis Crick
Francis Eugene Nipher
Francis Everitt
Francis F. Chen
Francis G. Slack
Francis H. Harlow
Francis Perrin
Francis Robbins Upton
Francis Sears
Francis Simon
Francis Wheeler Loomis
Francisco José Ynduráin
Franck Report
Franck–Condon principle
Franck–Hertz experiment
Franco-British Nuclear Forum
Franco Rasetti
Frank B. Jewett
Frank Benford
Frank Close
Frank Edward Smith
Frank Elmore Ross
Frank Farmer (physicist)
Frank Haig
Frank Hereford (University of Virginia)
Frank Isakson Prize for Optical Effects in Solids
Frank J. Low
Frank J. Tipler
Frank N. von Hippel
Frank Nabarro
Frank Oppenheimer
Frank Press
Frank Verstraete
Frank Wilczek
Franklin L. West
Franklin S. Cooper
Frank–Tamm formula
Frans Michel Penning
Franssen effect
František Běhounek
František Josef Gerstner
František Koláček
František Záviška
Franz Ernst Neumann
Franz Melde
Franz N. D. Kurie
Franz Ollendorff
Franz S. Exner
Franz Wegner
Franz Wittmann (physicist)
Franz–Keldysh effect
François Arago
François Englert
François Frenkiel
Frascati Tokamak Upgrade
Fraser Filter
Fraunhofer diffraction
Fraunhofer distance
Fraunhofer lines
Frazil ice
Fred Adams
Fred Alan Wolf
Fred Begay
Fred Cummings
Fred E. Wright
Fred Espenak
Fred Hoyle
Fred Kavli
Frederick Charles Frank
Frederick Eugene Wright
Frederick Grover
Frederick Guthrie
Frederick James Hargreaves
Frederick Lindemann, 1st Viscount Cherwell
Frederick Reines
Frederick Rossini
Frederick Seitz
Frederick Sumner Brackett
Frederick Thomas Trouton
Frederick Vine
Fredkin finite nature hypothesis
Free-air gravity anomaly
Free-electron laser
Free-fall atomic model
FreeFOAM
FreeON
Free body
Free body diagram
Free boundary problem
Free convective layer
Free electron model
Free entropy
Free expansion
Free fall
Free field
Free induction decay
Free molecular flow
Free particle
Free space
Free spectral range
Free streaming
Free surface
Free surface effect
Free will theorem
Freeman Dyson
Freeze thaw resistance
Freezing
Frenet–Serret formulas
Frenkel defect
Frequency
Frequency-resolved optical gating
Frequency agility
Frequency classification of plasmas
Frequency comb
Frequency domain sensor
Frequency range
Frequency spectrum
Fresnel (frequency)
Fresnel Imager
Fresnel diffraction
Fresnel equations
Fresnel mirror
Fresnel number
Fresnel rhomb
Fresnel zone
Fresnel–Arago laws
Fretting
Freund–Rubin compactification
Friction
Friction loss
Friedel Sellschop
Friedmann equations
Friedmann–Lemaître–Robertson–Walker metric
Friedrich Bopp
Friedrich Burmeister
Friedrich Carl Alwin Pockels
Friedrich Dessauer
Friedrich Ernst Dorn
Friedrich Hasenöhrl
Friedrich Hopfner
Friedrich Hund
Friedrich Kohlrausch
Friedrich Kottler
Friedrich Paschen
Friedrich Risner
Friedrich Robert Helmert
Friedwardt Winterberg
Fringe shift
Frisch–Peierls memorandum
Fritjof Capra
Frits Zernike
Fritz-Albert Popp
Fritz Fischer (physicist)
Fritz Houtermans
Fritz John
Fritz London
Fritz Peter Schäfer
Fritz Reiche
Fritz Sauter
Fritz Ursell
Fritz Zwicky
Frog battery
From Eternity to Here
Front velocity
Frontier molecular orbital theory
Frontiers of Physics in China
Frost flower (sea ice)
Froude number
Froude resistance curve
Froude–Krylov force
Frédéric Joliot-Curie
Fréedericksz transition
Fubini–Study metric
Fuel Cells (journal)
Fuel efficiency
Fuel mass fraction
Fuel temperature coefficient of reactivity
Fugacity
Fujikawa method
Fujita scale
Fujiwhara effect
Fukushima's Theorem
Full-Scale Tunnel
Fulvio Melia
Functional derivative
Functional integration
Functions of state
Fundamental Fysiks Group
Fundamental frequency
Fundamental interaction
Fundamental thermodynamic relation
Fundamental unit
Fundamentals of Physics
Furuta pendulum
Fusion Technology Center
Fusion energy gain factor
Fusion for Energy
Fusion power
Fusion rocket
Fusion rules
Fusion temperature
Fusion torch
Fusor
Future of an expanding universe
Fuzzball (string theory)
Fyodor Grigoryevich Reshetnikov
Fyodor Luzhin
Fåhræus–Lindqvist effect
Félix Savart
Förster coupling

Indexes of physics articles